Cedar Bay may refer to:

Cedar Bay (Missouri), a stream in the U.S. state of Missouri
Cedar Bay National Park, a protected area in Queensland, Australia